is a passenger railway station  located in the city of  Ashiya Hyōgo Prefecture, Japan. It is operated by the private transportation company Hanshin Electric Railway.

Lines

Layout
The station consists of two opposed ground-level side platforms connected by an underground passage. The ticket gates are located underground.

Platforms

Gallery

History 
Ashiya Station opened on 12 April 1905 along with the rest of the Hanshin Main Line.

On 17 January 1995, the station was damaged by the Great Hanshin earthquake. Service in the affected area was restored by 26 June 1995.

Station numbering was introduced on 21 December 2013, with Ashiya being designated as station number HS-20.

Passenger statistics
In fiscal 2019, the station was used by an average of 29,542 passengers daily

Surrounding area
Ashiya City Hall
 Ashiya Civic Center
Ashiya Park (5 minutes walk south, 芦屋公園)
Ashiya Police Station (50m north, 芦屋警察署)

See also
List of railway stations in Japan

References

External links

  Ashiya Station website 

Railway stations in Japan opened in 1905
Railway stations in Hyōgo Prefecture
Hanshin Main Line
Ashiya, Hyōgo